Tazmin Gray (born 4 August 1995) is an Australian rugby league footballer who plays for the New Zealand Warriors in the NRL Women's Premiership and the Burleigh Bears in the QRL Women's Premiership. 

Primarily a er, she has represented Australia and Queensland and won an NRL Women's Premiership with the Brisbane Broncos.

Background
Born in Tweed Heads, New South Wales, Gray played her junior rugby league for the Tugun Seahawks and Currumbin Eagles and attended Palm Beach Currumbin State High School. 

Her brother, Jordan Rapana, is a professional rugby league player who has represented New Zealand and the Cook Islands.

Playing career
In 2016, Gray began playing rugby league for the Burleigh Bears. In June 2016, she made her debut for Queensland in their 4–8 loss to New South Wales.

2018
In June, she represented South East Queensland at the Women's National Championships. In July, she joined the Sydney Roosters NRL Women's Premiership team. 

In Round 1 of the 2018 NRL Women's season, she made her debut for the Roosters in their 4–10 loss to the New Zealand Warriors.

2019
On 15 February, she represented the Māori All Stars in their 8–4 win over the Indigenous All Stars.

In May, Gray represented South East Queensland at the Women's National Championships. In July, she signed with the Brisbane Broncos NRLW team. 

That day, Gray and her brother Jordan, became the first brother and sister to play on NRL Grand Final day when Rapana played for the Canberra Raiders in the 2019 NRL Grand Final.

2020
On 18 September, Gray joined the New Zealand Warriors for the 2020 NRL Women's season. In Round 1 of the 2020 NRL Women's season, she made her debut for the Warriors in a loss to the Broncos, becoming the first person to play for three NRLW teams.

2021
On 20 February, Gray represented the Māori All Stars in their 24–0 win over the Indigenous All Stars.

During 2021, Gray signed with the Gold Coast Titans, one of three new NRLW franchises. In doing so she became the first player in the NRLW to play for four different clubs, and in four consecutive seasons.

References

External links
New Zealand Warriors profile

1995 births
Living people
Australian people of Māori descent
Australian people of Cook Island descent
Australian female rugby league players
Australia women's national rugby league team players
Brisbane Broncos (NRLW) players
New Zealand Māori rugby league players
Rugby league players from Tweed Heads, New South Wales
Rugby league second-rows
Sydney Roosters (NRLW) players

New Zealand Warriors (NRLW) players